Gémil is a commune in the Haute-Garonne department in southwestern France.

Population

The inhabitants of the commune are called Gémilois.

See also
Communes of the Haute-Garonne department

References

Gallery

Communes of Haute-Garonne